Redshaw Point is an ice-free point facing Markham Bay, situated between Hobbs Glacier and Ball Glacier, southeast James Ross Island. Named by United Kingdom Antarctic Place-Names Committee (UK-APC) in 1995 after Susan Margaret Redshaw (b. 1954), British Antarctic Survey (BAS) General Field Assistant at James Ross Island, 1990–91; Rothera Station, 1992–93; from 1994 to 1995, a member of the BAS field party in the Jame Ross Island area.
 

Headlands of James Ross Island